Pahari or Pahadi may refer to:
 Pahari language, the name of several languages of South Asia
 Pahari people (Nepal), an ethnic group of Nepal
 Pahari people, a cover term for many Northern Indo-Aryan speaking groups of Uttarakhand and Himachal Pradesh, India
 Pahari people (Kashmir), an ethnic group of the Kashmir region of India and Pakistan
 Pahari people (Bangladesh), a cover term for a number of ethnic groups of eastern Bangladesh
 Pahari painting, an art form of the Himalayas
 Pahari, Rajasthan, a village in India
 Pahari (Dungeons & Dragons), a fictional monster in the fantasy games

See also 
 Paharia (disambiguation)

Language and nationality disambiguation pages